Sessions 84–88 is a compilation album released in 2003 alongside Eurotechno on the Rephlex label. Brian Dougans, under the alias Humanoid; it is mostly experimental in nature and similar to the Stakker Humanoid release from Dougans also; Sessions also includes a remix of that track.

Track listing
 Stakker Humanoid (Snowman Mix) (4:47)
 Positive Electron (2:37)
 Keyboards, Effects [Vox Fx] - Colin Scott, Mark McLean
 Negative Electron (2:42)
 Rotation (2:34)
 Your Body Robotic (0:54)
 Keyboards, Effects [Vox Fx] - Colin Scott, Mark McLean
 Swamp Amp (1:24)
 Interlude Whistle (0:05)
 Delay Decay (0:53)
 Motion Static (3:28)
 E Prom Contact (2:37)
 Keyboards, Effects [Vox Fx] - Colin Scott, Mark McLean
 Hulme Slipway (1:38)
 Pulsar (2:16)
 Small Cluid (2:33)
 Jet Stream Tokyo (3:34)
 Cry Baby (4:53)
 Piano In Litchen (3:09)
 Laughing Box (4:24)
 Fx Dial (0:06)
 Nano Plura (3:54)
 Well Meaning (3:09)
 Land Of Ash (0:38)
 Zeebox (TV Dinner Part 1) (3:24)
 2nd Of May (1:23)

Crew
 Composed by Brian Dougans
 Produced by Brian Dougans (tracks: 1 to 15, 18) as Zeebox (tracks: 16, 17, 19 to 23)
 Co-produced by John Laker (tracks: 1, 14, 15)
 Additional keyboards and vox FX on some tracks by Mark Maclean (Buggy G. Riphead) and Colin Scott.

See also
Rephlex Records discography

References

External links
 

The Future Sound of London compilation albums
2003 compilation albums
Rephlex Records compilation albums